WBDY-LP is a Variety formatted broadcast radio station licensed to Binghamton, New York and serving Binghamton, Johnson City, Port Dickinson, Endicott, and Endwell in New York.  WBDY-LP is owned and operated by The Bundy Museum of History and Art.

References

External links
 99.5 WBDY-LP Online
 

2017 establishments in New York (state)
Variety radio stations in the United States
Radio stations established in 2017
BDY-LP
BDY-LP